Trud Stadium is a bandy arena in Ulyanovsk, Russia. It is the home arena of bandy club Volga-SDYuSShOR, which is playing in the second-tier Russian Bandy Supreme League. With a higher spectator capacity than the more modern Volga-Sport-Arena in the same city, the semi-final Russia participated in and the final of the 2016 Bandy World Championship were played at Trud.

Trud holds 15,000 seated spectators. The total area of the stadium is 40,711 m2 with an ice of 8,600 m2 or 100x65 m playing field.

During the summer, the arena is used by an association football team FC Volga Ulyanovsk.

References

Bandy venues in Russia
Football venues in Russia
Sport in Ulyanovsk